The Pennsylvania State Game Lands Number 148 are Pennsylvania State Game Lands in Beaver County in Pennsylvania in the United States providing hunting, hiking, bird watching, wildlife photography and other activities.

Geography
Most of the Game Lands is located in Ohioville Borough with a small portion of the eastern end located in Industry Borough. Other nearby communities are Glasgow, Midland and Shippingport Boroughs, and populated places Fairview, Five Points, and Smiths Ferry.

Statistics
It falls within the 15052 United States Postal Service zip code.

Biology
Game Lands 173 offers hunting and furtaking for beaver (Castor canadensis), Coyote (Canis latrans), White-tailed deer (Odocoileus virginianus), Gray fox (Urocyon cinereoargenteus), Red fox (Vulpes Vulpes), Ruffed grouse (Bonasa umbellus), mink (Neovison vison), Muskrat (Ondatra zibethicus), Raccoon (Procyon lotor), squirrel (Sciurus carolinensis), turkey (Meleagris gallopavo) and possibly Bobcat (Lynx rufus). Non-game birds of special concern in SGL 173 are Scarlet tanager (Piranga olivacea), Cerulean warbler (Setophaga cerulean), and Kentucky warbler (Geothlypis Formosa).

See also
 Pennsylvania State Game Lands
 Pennsylvania State Game Lands Number 148, also located in Beaver County
 Pennsylvania State Game Lands Number 189, also located in Beaver County
 Pennsylvania State Game Lands Number 285, also located in Beaver County

References

173
Protected areas of Beaver County, Pennsylvania